Mandranwala (Urdu/Punjabi:مندرانوالہ) is a village near Daska in Sialkot District in the Punjab province of Pakistan. Mandranwala is a medium-sized village situated only three kilometers Daska City. It is 28 kilometers from Sialkot City.

References

Villages in Sialkot District